Ransom House may refer to:

in the United States (by state)
James H. Ransom House, Ottawa, Kansas, listed on the National Register of Historic Places in Franklin County, Kansas
Ransom House (Crittenden, Kentucky), listed on the National Register of Historic Places in Boone County, Kentucky
Edward Ransom Farmstead, Livestock and Equipment Barn, Midway, Arkansas, listed on the National Register of Historic Places in White County, Arkansas
Ransom House (Ennis, Texas), listed on the National Register of Historic Places in Ellis County, Texas
Organizations
RansomHouse, hacking group specalised in extorsion malware